Iowa Highway 102 (Iowa 102) is a very short state highway entirely within the city of New Sharon, Iowa.  The entire  route is along Market Street in New Sharon.  The route begins at New Sharon's western city limit where it continues as Mahaska County Road G5T and ends at the corner of Market and Main Streets in New Sharon, where U.S. Route 63 and Iowa Highway 146 intersect.

Route description
Iowa 102 began at exit 44, a diamond interchange along Iowa 163 at Pella. It headed north along Adams Street until it reached Vermeer Road. It continued in a stairstep path as it ran east for four miles then turned to the north for one mile (1.6 km). Now at the western city limits of New Sharon, the current extent of Iowa 102 begins. Along Market Street, Iowa 102 travels  to Main Street. At the corner of Main and Market Streets, Iowa 102 comes from the west and ends, US 63 approaches from the south on Main Street and leaves east on Market, and Iowa 146 begins and heads to the north.

History
Originally designated in 1980, Iowa 102 connected the cities of Pella and New Sharon.  In Pella, Iowa 102's western end moved a few times.  Upon its designation, Iowa 102 ended at Main Street, then Iowa Highway 163, at Central Park in downtown Pella.  In the mid-1980s, the western end moved to what is now 240th Place in Mahaska County, just east of Pella.  In 1996, when Iowa 163 was bypassed around Pella, Iowa 102's western end was again moved, this time to where the new Iowa 163 bypass rejoined the older Iowa 163, now Iowa 163 Business.

On December 23, 2002, the Mahaska County Board of Supervisors voted unanimously to accept  of the  route, extending from the Iowa Highway 163 bypass to the western city limits of New Sharon leaving only the half-mile segment in New Sharon on the state rolls.  The Iowa Department of Transportation approved the transfer on January 13, 2003.

Major intersections

References

102
State highways in the United States shorter than one mile
Transportation in Mahaska County, Iowa